Zande may refer to:
 Zande people, of north central Africa
 Zande language, the language of the Azande people
 Zande, Belgium
 Xande, Zande in the NES fan translation, a major antagonist of Final Fantasy III

Language and nationality disambiguation pages